Mark Canning (born 12 September 1983 in Glasgow) is a Scottish footballer.

Career

Canning started his career at Kilmarnock, making his debut on 23 August 2001 in a 1–0 win over Glenavon in the UEFA Cup. His league debut came nearly eight months later in May 2002 when he replaced Shaun Dillon during a 2–2 draw with Dundee United. However Canning struggled to establish himself in the side and was released by Kilmarnock in 2005, joining Stirling Albion.

He remained at Forthbank Stadium for a short time, later joining Dumbarton, where he established himself in the first team, making over 90 appearances in all competitions during a three-year spell. Despite helping the side to the Scottish Third Division title, Canning was released by the club at the end of the season, instead signing with Albion Rovers. He made his debut on 25 July 2009 as a last minute substitute during a 2–0 win over Ayr United in the Challenge Cup, his first goal coming on 10 October in a 2–0 win over Elgin City.

On 27 August 2010, Canning left Albion Rovers he left and now he is playing amateur football.

On 10 January 2020, Canning signed for Junior Side Arthurlie

Honours
Dumbarton

Scottish Division Three (fourth tier): Winners 2008–09

References

External links
 Official website profile

1983 births
Living people
Footballers from Glasgow
Scottish footballers
Stirling Albion F.C. players
Kilmarnock F.C. players
Dumbarton F.C. players
Albion Rovers F.C. players
Scottish Premier League players
Scottish Football League players
Association football midfielders